Brian Chippendale (born July 22, 1973) is an American musician and artist, known as the drummer and vocalist for the experimental noise rock band Lightning Bolt and for his graphic art. Chippendale is based in Providence, Rhode Island.

Brian plays an assortment of drums usually decorated with prints he makes himself. He uses two ride cymbals as crash rides and a Ludwig snare drum.

Early life and education 
Chippendale was born July 22, 1973 in Newburgh, New York and was raised in a suburb near Philadelphia, Pennsylvania. Chippendale is also an artist and attended printmaking classes at Rhode Island School of Design (RISD) in the late 1990s through 2000, but did not graduate.

Music 

As a vocalist for Lightning Bolt and Mindflayer, Chippendale eschews the usual microphone stand and conventional microphone, instead using a contact microphone. This microphone is then run through an effects processor to alter the sound further. Chippendale often warbles or makes nonsensical sounds into the microphone, so the vocals typically come out extremely distorted and incomprehensible.  More recently, Chippendale has used a Line 6 delay pedal to delay and repeat his vocals while drumming.

Chippendale participated as drummer 77 in the Boredoms' 77 Boadrum performance which occurred on July 7, 2007, at the Empire-Fulton Ferry State Park in Brooklyn.

Chippendale performed drums on Björk's 2007 album Volta. He also did a remix for Björk's single "Declare Independence" under the alias Black Pus.

Chippendale is part of the duo Wasted Shirt with Ty Segall, releasing their debut album, Fungus II, in 2020.

Graphic art 

Chippendale created the album art for all Lightning Bolt releases. In October 2006, Chippendale released the comic book Ninja, an art book and comic that incorporates simple action comics he drew as a child with more surreal work drawn as an adult. In 2007 he released Maggots, which was drawn ten years previously but had never been released. Maggots is drawn over a Japanese book catalog, so Japanese characters appear in all the spaces that are not inked in by his pen. His next graphic novel, "If n' Oof", was published on June 30, 2010.

In June 2010 an exhibit Fruiting Bodies of Chippendale's artwork opened at the Cinders Gallery in Brooklyn. Since May 2011, Chippendale has published a monthly comic in Mothers News, a monthly newspaper published in Providence, Rhode Island.

In February 2016, Chippendale published another graphic novel with Drawn and Quarterly entitled Puke Force. In 2016, an article entitled "100 Greatest Drummers of All Time" in Rolling Stone magazine ranked Brian Chippendale as number 91.

Chippendale currently shares a large industrial studio space in Providence with his wife, Jungil Hong, which they call the "Hilarious Attic". Chippendale and Hong have a son.

Discography

Lightning Bolt 
 Lightning Bolt (1999)
 Ride the Skies (2001)
 Wonderful Rainbow (2003)
 Hypermagic Mountain (2005)
 Earthly Delights (2009)
 Oblivion Hunter (2012)
 Fantasy Empire (2015)
 Sonic Citadel (2019)

Black Pus 
Black Pus 1 (2005)
Black Pus 2 (2006)
Black Pus 3: Metamorpus (2006)
Black Pus 4: All Aboard the Magic Pus (2008)
Black Pus Zero: Ultimate Beat Off (2009)
Primordial Pus (2011)
Pus Mortem (2012)
All My Relations (2013)
 Black Pus split LP with Oozing Wound (2014)
Def Vesper (2020)

Boredoms 
77Boadrum (2007)

Wasted Shirt 
Fungus II (2020)

References

External links
 Brian Chippendale's official website
 Brian Chippendale's Instagram
 Brian Chippendale's Artwork store

Living people
1973 births
Alternative cartoonists
Musicians from Providence, Rhode Island
Rhode Island School of Design alumni
Rhode Island School of Design alumni in music
Artists from Providence, Rhode Island
20th-century American drummers
American male drummers
21st-century American drummers
20th-century American male musicians
21st-century American male musicians